Westfall Place is a historic home located near Moorefield, Hardy County, West Virginia. It was built around 1860, and is a two-story brick dwelling in the Greek Revival style.  It features a temple form entrance portico.

It was listed on the National Register of Historic Places in 1985.

References

Houses on the National Register of Historic Places in West Virginia
Greek Revival houses in West Virginia
Houses completed in 1860
Houses in Hardy County, West Virginia
National Register of Historic Places in Hardy County, West Virginia